Ghazaleh-ye Do (also Romanized as Ghazāleh-ye Do; also known as Ghazāleh) is a village in Howmeh-ye Gharbi Rural District, in the Central District of Ramhormoz County, Khuzestan Province, Iran. At the 2006 census, its population was 50, in 10 families.

References 

Populated places in Ramhormoz County